Leiboldia is a genus of flowering plants belonging the family Asteraceae. It is also in the tribe Vernonieae.

It is native to Mexico.

The genus name of Leiboldia is in honour of Friedrich Ernst Leibold (1804–1864), a German gardener and botanical collector. 
It was first described and published in Linnaea Vol.19 on page 742 in 1847.

Known species
According to Kew;

References

External links

Vernonieae
Asteraceae genera
Flora of Mexico
Plants described in 1847